Riccardo Freda (24 February 1909 – 20 December 1999) was an Italian film director. He worked in a variety of genres, including sword-and-sandal, horror, giallo and spy films.

Freda began directing I Vampiri in 1956. The film became the first Italian sound horror film production.

Biography
Riccardo Freda was born in 1909 in Alexandria, Egypt to Italian parents. Freda attended school in Milan where he took art classes at the Centro Sperimantale. After school he took on work as a sculptor and art critic.

Film career
Freda first began working in the film industry in 1937 and directed his first film Don Cesare di Bazan in 1942. Freda began directing I Vampiri. I Vampiri was the first Italian horror film of the sound era, following the lone silent horror film Il mostro di Frankenstein (1920)  Despite being the first, a wave of Italian horror productions did not follow until Mario Bava's film Black Sunday was released internationally.

Freda died on 20 December 1999 in Rome.

Filmography

Notes
 a Freda has denied having taken part in writing the script for this film, despite being credited. 
 b Freda was originally to direct the film but stated that he walked off the set on the first day of shooting. 
 c Freda name is not in the credits but some sources state he directed several battles scenes in the film, which Freda denies. 
 d Freda name is not in the credits but some sources state he edited the naval battle scenes in the film, which Freda denies. 
 e Freda has claimed to have shot the entire film.

References

Bibliography

External links

Freda, Riccardo
Freda, Riccardo
Freda, Riccardo
Giallo film directors
Horror film directors
Italian male screenwriters
20th-century Italian screenwriters
People from Alexandria
20th-century Italian male writers